The 2013 Singapore League Cup (known as the Starhub League Cup for sponsorship purposes) is a cup competition played in the month of June 2013.

The draw for the Cup was held on Sunday, 12 May 2013 at the Football Association of Singapore's headquarters in Jalan Besar Stadium, Singapore. Apart from the teams in the S.League which participated in the Starhub League Cup, the 2013 edition also saw an NFL side qualify for the cup draw following a playoff between four sides: Singapore Recreation Club and Singapore Cricket Club, who are the NFL Division 1 Champions and Runners-up, and Admiralty Football Club and Sporting Westlake FC, who are the NFL Division 2 Champions and Runners-up.

Admiralty FC made it through to the tournament proper; after trailing 0-1 they scored three goals to defeat Singapore Recreation Club 3-1.

The League Cup semi finals, League Cup final and Plate final were originally scheduled to be played on 20 June 2013 and 23 June 2013 respectively but were postponed to September 2013 in view of the worsening haze conditions in Singapore.

Preliminary playoffs
The semi-finals of the preliminary playoffs were played on 5 May 2013.

Admiralty FC beat Singapore Cricket Club 2-1 in the first semi-final, while Singapore Recreation Club edged out Sporting Westlake 1-0 in the other semi-final.

The final of the preliminary playoffs was held on 12 May 2013 at 5pm, just before the League Cup draw was held at the same venue. Admiralty FC prevailed against Singapore Recreation Club despite going behind after 21 minutes; the Wolves triumphed after former S.League players, Jonathan Xu and Guntur Djafril, as well as former football reality show First XI contestant, Haziq Sudhir, each scored a goal to reverse the score in Admiralty's favour.

As an added incentive for the NFL side, a $2,000 prize money was also presented to the winning team on top of successfully progressing into the 2013 StarHub League Cup. This new move by the S.League is aimed at giving NFL teams an opportunity to experience the professional competitiveness level of a cup competition.

Preliminary Playoffs Knockout stage

Preliminary Playoff Semi-finals

Preliminary Playoff final

First round

The 2013 Starhub League Cup draw was held at Jalan Besar Stadium on 12 May 2013 following Admiralty FC's victory over Singapore Recreation Club, ensuring the NFL Division One side's inclusion in the 2013 edition of the Cup.

Harimau Muda B, Woodlands Wellington, Home United and preliminary playoff winners Admiralty FC were drawn into Group A, while Tampines Rovers, Courts Young Lions and Tanjong Pagar United made up Group B.

Albirex Niigata (S), Hougang United and Geylang International were drawn into Group C and Brunei DPMM, Balestier Khalsa and Warriors F.C. made up Group D, which is also known as the "Cup Winners" group due to the three being the previous season's RHB Singapore Cup winners, League Cup Plate winners and League Cup winners.

The League Cup was originally scheduled to be played within the month of June in a round robin format with the original fixtures announced by FAS on 21 May 2013. However, due to the haze conditions in Singapore, the League Cup semi finals, League Cup final and Plate final, which were originally scheduled to be played on 20 June 2013 and 23 June 2013 respectively, were postponed to September 2013.

Preliminary stage
Group A: Admiralty FC (Preliminary Playoff Winners), Harimau Muda B, Home United, Woodlands Wellington

Group B: Young Lions FC, Tampines Rovers, Tanjong Pagar United

Group C: Albirex Niigata (S), Geylang International, Hougang United

Group D: Balestier Khalsa, DPMM FC, Warriors FC

Group A

Matches

Group B

Matches

Group C

Matches

Group D

Matches

Knockout stage

Quarter-finals

Semi-finals

Final

Plate Competition

Like the 2012 edition of the League Cup, the second runners-up from each group will face each other in the semi-finals of the League Cup Plate Competition.

The winners will go on to meet each other in the League Cup Plate Finals.

Plate Knockout Stage

Plate Semi-finals

Plate final

Cup Statistics

Top goalscorers
.

See also
 S.League
 Singapore Cup
 Singapore Charity Shield
 Football Association of Singapore
 List of football clubs in Singapore

References

 

2013
League Cup
2013 domestic association football cups
June 2013 sports events in Asia
September 2013 sports events in Asia